Liu Yun (born 7 January 1995) is a Chinese footballer who currently plays as a  left-footed midfielder for Wuhan Zall.

Club career
Liu Yun would be promoted to the senior team of Wuhan Zall in the 2014 China League One campaign and would go on to make his debut on 21 March 2015 in a league game against Tianjin Songjiang F.C. that ended in a 1–0 defeat. He would go on to be an integral member of the team that gained promotion to the top tier for the club by winning the 2018 China League One division. He would make his top tier debut on 14 April 2019 against Shanghai SIPG F.C. in a league game that ended in a 2–1 defeat.

Career statistics

Honours

Club
Wuhan Zall
 China League One: 2018

References

External links

1995 births
Living people
Chinese footballers
Association football midfielders
China League One players
Chinese Super League players
Wuhan F.C. players